Phassus aurigenus is a moth of the family Hepialidae. It is known from Costa Rica.

References

Moths described in 1914
Hepialidae